Michael J. Durant (born July 23, 1961) is an American veteran, former pilot, businessman, author, and political candidate. He was involved in the "Black Hawk Down" incident while serving as a U.S. Army pilot, and ran unsuccessfully in the Republican primary for the 2022 United States Senate election in Alabama.

Durant was a member of the 160th Special Operations Aviation Regiment (Night Stalkers) as a Chief Warrant Officer 3. He retired from the U.S. Army as a Chief Warrant Officer 4 Blackhawk helicopter Master Aviator in the 160th SOAR after participating in combat operations Prime Chance, Just Cause, and Desert Storm, and also Gothic Serpent, in which he was briefly held prisoner in 1993 after a raid in Somalia.

Following his retirement from the military in 2001, Durant published a book detailing his experiences, was involved in public speaking engagements and founded an engineering company in Huntsville, Alabama. He also became politically active as a member of the Republican Party.

Early life and military training
Durant was born on July 23, 1961, in Berlin, New Hampshire, the son of Leon Durant and Louise (nee Boucher). He enlisted in the U.S. Army in August 1979; after completing basic training, he attended the Defense Language Institute. He was assigned to the 470th Military Intelligence Group at Fort Clayton in Panama as a Spanish voice intercept operator. Durant finished helicopter flight training at Fort Rucker, Alabama. During flight school, he flew the TH-55 trainer and UH-1 helicopters.

U.S. Army service

 
In November 1983, Durant was promoted to Warrant Officer 1, following completion of the UH-60 Blackhawk Aviators Qualification Course, and was assigned to the 377th Medical Evacuation Company in Seoul, South Korea. Durant flew over 150 medical evacuation missions in the UH-1 and UH-60 helicopters by 1985. He later moved to the 101st (Division) Aviation Battalion at Fort Campbell, Kentucky. While serving as a Chief Warrant Officer 2, he took the flight instructor's pilot course and conducted air assault missions in the UH-60. Durant joined the 160th Special Operations Aviation Regiment (SOAR) on August 1, 1988. Assigned to D Company, he performed duties as Flight Lead and Standardization Instructor Pilot. He participated in combat operations Prime Chance, Just Cause and Operation Desert Storm, where he was the first U.S. helicopter pilot to shoot at a SCUD missile launcher.

"Black Hawk Down" incident
During Operation Gothic Serpent in Somalia, Durant was the pilot of helicopter "Super Six Four". His was the second MH-60L of two Black Hawk helicopters to crash during the Battle of Mogadishu on October 3, 1993. After his helicopter was hit on the tail by a RPG-7, it crashed about a mile southwest of the operation's target.

Durant and his crew of three, Bill Cleveland, Ray Frank, and Tommy Field, were badly injured in the crash. Durant suffered a crushed vertebra in his back and a compound fracture of his left femur. Two Delta Force snipers, MSG Gary Gordon and SFC Randy Shughart, had been providing suppressive fire from the air at hostile Somalis who were converging on the crash site. Both volunteered for insertion onto the ground to protect the crew and join Durant in fighting off the advancing Somalis. The pair killed numerous Somalis before they ran out of ammunition. They were soon overwhelmed and killed, after Cleveland, Frank and Field had died. Both Gordon and Shughart received the Medal of Honor posthumously for their heroism in this action.

The hostile Somalis captured Durant, the sole American survivor, and held him captive for 11 days. During much of his imprisonment, he was personally protected and cared for by Abdullahi "Firimbi" Hassan, a physician and propaganda minister to Somali General Mohamed Farrah Aidid, though he was shot in his arm by an intruding militia member. Aidid then released Durant and a Nigerian soldier who had been captured previously into the custody of the International Committee of the Red Cross.

After being freed, and recovering at Landstuhl Regional Medical Center (LRMC) in Germany, Durant resumed flying with the 160th SOAR. He retired from the Army in 2001 with more than 3,700 flight hours, over 1,400 of which were flown with night vision goggles.

Durant's military service awards include the Distinguished Service Medal, Distinguished Flying Cross with Oak Leaf Cluster, Bronze Star with Valor Device, Purple Heart, Meritorious Service Medal, three Air Medals and the Prisoner of War Medal, among others.

Business ventures and writing
After his retirement, Durant moved to Alabama and began offering seminars to military personnel about helicopter maneuvering and Combat Search and Rescue (CSAR) operations. Durant talks about the Somalia raid and the experiences he had while in captivity. He spoke extensively with actor Ron Eldard, who portrayed him in the 2001 film Black Hawk Down, which depicts the events of the raid.

In 2003, Durant published a book, In the Company of Heroes, in which he chronicled his military career and his captivity.

Durant holds a BSc degree in professional aeronautics and a MBA degree in aviation management from the Embry-Riddle Aeronautical University. Following his move to Alabama, he became owner, president and CEO of Pinnacle Solutions, an engineering services company based in Huntsville, Alabama, in 2008. The company's clients include the U.S. Navy, the U.S. Marine Corps and NASA, among others. In December 2021, after the launch of his campaign for the U.S. Senate, Durant turned over control of Pinnacle Solutions to its employees via an Employee Stock Ownership Plan.

Political career

Early activities
Durant became involved in politics after his retirement from the military; as a Republican, he served on the presidential campaigns of George W. Bush in 2004 and John McCain in 2008, both times in a veterans' leadership role.

In July 2008, Durant criticized then-presidential candidate Barack Obama for having cancelled a planned trip to LRMC near Ramstein Air Base where he had intended, while in Europe, to visit American casualties of the Iraq and Afghanistan wars. Durant said he thought this was inappropriate for a potential commander in chief. Scott Gration, a retired two-star Air Force general who advised the Obama campaign, said in a response that Obama "did not want to see our wounded warriors perceived as a campaign event when his visit was to show his appreciation for our troops and decided instead not to go."

In 2011, Durant gave a speech to the U.S. Army War College, during which he mentioned the opinion that "disarming the population," like what had been done in Somalia, would be "a pretty good step toward law and order" in U.S. cities. The comments re-emerged during Durant's campaign for the U.S. Senate; the campaign of primary opponent Katie Britt charged that Durant's worldview was "not conservative." Durant claimed that media outlets had mischaracterized and taken his statements out of context. In an interview with radio host Phil Williams, Durant stated, "I'm not condoning it. In fact, I'm arguing against it, that it really isn't a smart tactic – certainly not when you're outnumbered like we were there."

2022 U.S. Senate candidacy
In September 2021, media speculation arose regarding a possible run for U.S. Senate by Durant. He officially launched a campaign for the office on October 19, 2021, running to replace retiring incumbent Senator Richard Shelby in 2022. A late entry to the race, Durant positioned himself as a political outsider and supporter of former President Donald Trump, outlining an "Alabama First" campaign tour. Durant was supported by the More Perfect Union political action committee, which supports the formation of a caucus of centrist senators.

By March 2022, Durant began to lead in polls against the two major opposing candidates in the Republican primary, Shelby's former Chief of Staff Katie Britt and Representative Mo Brooks. Durant's lead expanded after Brooks was un-endorsed by Trump. That same month, Durant expressed in interviews that he believed President Joe Biden was "not rightfully elected" in the 2020 presidential election and that he would not have voted to certify the election results, as well as support for removing Biden from office.

In April 2022, the Alabama Republican Party proposed a series of televised debates between Durant, Britt and Brooks. Durant's campaign did not agree to participate in these debates, and declined to comment when asked about the debates. Britt, Brooks, and other political analysts such as Quin Hillyer and Steve Flowers criticized Durant for an apparent refusal to debate. Brooks said that Durant "has the public policy chops of a snail," while Britt questioned if Durant had "something to hide." Alabama Republican Party Chairman John Wahl stated that the debates were unlikely to occur without Durant's participation. Durant broke the silence on the debates on April 21, 2022, stating that he was open to debating but also cited scheduling issues with his own campaign schedule. Durant then officially declined the proposed dates for the debates later that month, shuttering the plans for the debate series.

Durant began to slip in polls around May, in the weeks before the primary election. Durant was the subject of multiple negative attack ads that contributed to a rising unfavorable rating among voters in polls. Additionally, Durant was the subject of speculation that he did not actually live in Alabama, which The New York Times called "a false claim." Durant's views on immigration also attracted attention shortly before the primary; he claimed in a radio interview that increased legal immigration was "America First" while also touting that he was "the toughest on illegal immigration." On the night of the primary on May 24, Durant conceded the election after incoming results showed him in third place behind Britt and Brooks. Although there was media speculation that Durant would endorse Brooks after losing a spot in the runoff, in June, Durant officially declined to endorse Brooks or Britt, lambasting the political process and the two remaining candidates. Durant also stated that his campaign would be his last foray into politics, blaming his loss on "blatant" untrue attack ads.

Personal life
Durant and his wife, Lisa (who is also a former Army aviator), reside in Madison, Alabama. They have six children and three grandchildren. Durant's previous marriage to his first wife, Lorrie, ended in divorce; Durant later stated that his handling of the media attention he received in the wake of the "Black Hawk Down" incident "probably was a contributing factor" to the divorce.

Works

Awards and decorations
Durant's awards include:

References

1961 births
American Master Army Aviators
American prisoners of war
Battle of Mogadishu (1993)
Candidates in the 2022 United States Senate elections
Embry–Riddle Aeronautical University alumni
Living people
New Hampshire Republicans
People from Berlin, New Hampshire
People from Madison, Alabama
Recipients of the Air Medal
Recipients of the Distinguished Flying Cross (United States)
Recipients of the Distinguished Service Medal (US Army)
United States Army officers
Candidates in the 2022 United States elections